The 141st Air Refueling Squadron (141 ARS) is a unit of the New Jersey Air National Guard 108th Wing located at McGuire Air Force Base, New Jersey. The 141st is equipped with the KC-135R Stratotanker.

The 141 ARS was first organized as the 141st Aero Squadron on 2 January 1918 at Rockwell Field, California.   The squadron deployed to France and fought on the Western Front during World War I as a pursuit squadron as part of the American Expeditionary Forces.  The unit was demobilized after the war in 1919.

History

141st Aero Squadron

The 141st Aero Squadron (Pursuit) was a United States Army Air Service pursuit squadron, and part of the American Expeditionary Force.   It was assigned to the 4th Pursuit Group, Second United States Army, AEF near the end of World War I.

The squadron saw limited combat, and with Second Army's planned offensive drive on Metz cancelled due to the 1918 Armistice with Germany, the squadron was assigned to the United States Third Army as part of the Occupation of the Rhineland in Germany. It returned to the United States in July 1919.

Organization
The squadron was organized at Rockwell Field, San Diego, California, on 8 October 1917.  It was organized as an un-designated provisional unit with men drawn from the 14th and 18th Training Squadrons already at the field.   The squadron trained with Curtiss JN-4 Jennies at Rockwell Field.   It was not until the latter part of December that the mechanics and support enlisted personnel were assigned to the squadron, and was given its formal designation as the 141st on 2 January 1918, when it was ordered to proceed to Garden City, New York, for overseas deployment.

The 141st reached Field No. 2, near Garden City on 9 January, where final preparations for the squadron were made for overseas shipment.   On 15 January it moved to Pier No. 45, Hoboken, New Jersey, where it boarded the Cunard liner , arriving at Halifax, Nova Scotia, awaiting to form up into a convoy.  on the 19th, it began the overseas journey with seven other ships along with the cruiser USS San Diego, arriving at Glasgow, Scotland on 30 January.   On the 31st, after a train trip to Winchester, England, the squadron was assigned to the Morn Hill Rest Camp for classification and advanced training in England.

Training in England
For the next several months, the squadron went through advanced training to prepare it for combat at the front in France.  "A" Flight was assigned to Dover, Kent;  "B" Flight at the Hounslow Heath Aerodrome, near London, and "C" Flight to Northolt Airdrome, also near London.   On 9 March 1918, the squadron reformed at Northolt, where it proceeded to the Swingate Down Airdrome, near Dover, Kent where it received final training by the Royal Flying Corps.

The squadron arrived in France on 16 August 1918 and moved to the St. Maixent Aerodrome for equipping.  Orders to move were received on 27 August for the Air Service Production Center No. 2 at Romorantin Aerodrome, where it waited for another nineteen days.  Finally on 16 September it moved again to the 1st Air Depot at Colombey-les-Belles Airdrome where the 141st received SPAD XIII pursuit aircraft.   There it was assigned to the 4th Pursuit Group, and moved to Croix de Metz Aerodrome (Toul) for combat duty, arriving on 19 October.

Meuse-Argonne Offensive

The squadron's insignia was an orange and black tiger with a flyer's helmet. The 141st flew its first patrol on 23 October and every day thereafter.  Its combat commander, Hobey Baker, was a famous hockey and football star at Princeton before the war.  It was said, Hobey preferred Ivy League men in his unit, preferably from Princeton.  Indeed, he painted the aircraft in his squadron in Princeton colors:  Orange and Black.

The 141st shot down its first enemy aircraft on 28 October, by Captain Baker.  A second enemy aircraft was shot down on 6 November by a patrol consisting of Captain Baker and Lieutenants Shelby, Cady, Hamiln and Chappell.  The 141st was involved in 13 combats, the only pursuit squadron of the Air Service, Second Army to do so.

After the November 1918 Armistice with Germany, the squadron remained at Gengault Aerodrome.   Tragically, its commander, Captain Hobey Baker was killed on 21 December 1918 when he took a SPAD XIII up for one last ride.  The SPAD developed engine trouble while taking off and Baker died when the aircraft crashed soon thereafter.

Third Army of Occupation
On 19 April 1919, the squadron was assigned to the Third Army Air Service, 5th Pursuit Group.  It was moved to Coblenz Airdrome, Germany, to serve as part of the occupation force of the Rhineland.  For the next several months the squadron was able to perform test flights on surrendered German aircraft. Flights of the Fokker D.VII, Pfalz D.XII, Halberstadts and Rumpler aircraft were made and evaluations were made.

Demobilization
On 18 June 1919, orders were received from Third Army for the squadron to report to the 1st Air Depot, Colombey-les-Belles Airdrome to turn in all of its supplies and equipment and was relieved from duty with the AEF. The squadron's SPAD aircraft were delivered to the Air Service American Air Service Acceptance Park No. 1 at Orly Aerodrome to be returned to the French.  There practically all of the pilots and observers were detached from the squadron.

Personnel at Colombey were subsequently assigned to the Commanding General, Services of Supply and ordered to report to one of several staging camps in France.  There, personnel awaited scheduling to report to one of the Base Ports in France for transport to the United States. Upon return to the US, most squadron personnel were demobilized at Camp Mills, New York on 18 July 1919.

Reconstitution
On 8 September 1973 By order of the Secretary of the Air Force, the 141st Aero Squadron (Pursuit), demobilized on 19 July 1919 was reconstituted and allotted to the State of New Jersey.  It was ordered consolidated with the 141st Tactical Fighter Squadron.  The consolidated unit was designated as the 141st Tactical Fighter Squadron and was extended federal recognition by the National Guard Bureau same date.   The consolidated unit was also bestowed the lineage, history, honors, and colors of the 141st Aero Squadron (Pursuit).

World War II

 see: 348th Fighter Group for full World War II history
The 341st Fighter Squadron was activated at Mitchel Army Airfield, New York, on 30 September 1942. It was equipped with the P-47 Thunderbolt. The 341st was one of the first USAAF squadrons to be equipped with the P-47.

After an extended period of training in the northeast United States, the squadron deployed to Archer Field (Archerfield Airport), Brisbane, Australia in June 1943.  Began long-range missions to strike at Japanese targets in New Guinea. In mid-June the 341st made the 1,200-mile flight from Brisbane to Port Moresby, New Guinea. The unit operated from New Guinea and Noemfoor until November 1944, flying patrol and reconnaissance missions and escorted bombers to targets in New Guinea and New Britain.

In 1944 the 341st began to attack airfields, installations, and shipping in western New Guinea, Ceram, and Halmahera to aid in neutralizing those areas preparatory to the US invasion of the Philippines.  When U.S. troops landed on Luzon the squadron in process of conversion from P-47's to P-51 Mustangs, began operation from San Marcelino airstrip a few days after the landing at San Marcelino and Subic Bay. From this location the unit engaged in ground support operations, bombing and strafing in close support of ground troops.  Remained in the Philippines throughout the campaign, moving to Okinawa in mid July 1945 in preparation for the planned invasion of Japan.  Engaged in long-range operations over the Japanese Home Islands until ceasing combat on 14 August 1945.

Became part of the Army of Occupation in Japan, moving to Itami Airfield, Japan in October 1945 as part of Far East Air Forces. Inactivated at Itami Airfield on 10 May 1946.

New Jersey Air National Guard
The wartime 341st Fighter Squadron was re-designated as the 141st Fighter Squadron, and was allotted to the New Jersey Air National Guard, on 24 May 1946. It was organized and re-designated as the 141st Strategic Fighter Squadron at Mercer Airport, Trenton, New Jersey and was extended federal recognition on 26 May 1949. The 141st Strategic Fighter Squadron was entitled to the history, honors, and colors of the 341st. The squadron was equipped with F-47D Thunderbolts and was assigned to the 108th Strategic Fighter Group.

In the late 1940s, the new Strategic Air Command (SAC) was manned by personnel of the wartime Eighth and Fifteenth Air Forces. During World War II they usually encountered swarms of enemy fighters and knew the importance of having fighter escorts. In the postwar era, SAC had fighter wings placed under their own operational control.  The squadron trained in escorting SAC's B-29 and later B-50 and B-36 strategic bombers.

The unit was called to active federal service on 1 March 1951.  The squadron was sent to Turner AFB, Georgia where it continued its mission to provide fighter escorts to SAC bombers on training missions. In December 1951 it was moved to Godman AFB, Kentucky where it replaced a unit deployed to England. It was released from active duty and returned to New Jersey state control on 10 November 1952.

With return to state control, the parent 108th SFW was transferred to Air Defense Command (ADC) and was re-designated as a Fighter-Interceptor Wing.  The 141st Fighter-Interceptor Squadron was re-equipped with the long-range North American P-51H Mustang fighter. Designed for the invasion of Japan, the P-51H was the last variant of the P-51 Mustang of World War II, but was produced too late to see any wartime combat. Not used in the Korean War due to it not being believed as "rugged" as its famous "D" model predecessor, the P-51H was used instead to equip Air National Guard units into the 1950s as an ADC interceptor.  In 1955, the Mustangs were retired and the squadron entered the jet age, with the arrival of the North American F-86E Sabre.

The parent 108th FIW was transferred to Tactical Air Command (TAC) in 1958, being re-designated as a Tactical Fighter Wing.  The 141st Tactical Fighter Squadron transferred its interceptors and received and F-84F Thunderstreak fighter-bombers.

At the height of the Cold War in 1961, the squadron was again federalized as a result of tensions concerning the Berlin Wall. 28 F-84F's of the 141st TFS and officers and airmen from all three squadrons of the 108th TFW were deployed to Chaumont-Semoutiers AB, France on 16 October with the last aircraft and personnel arriving on 6 November. The ground units deployed by sealift, with the deployed elements reaching Chaumont by 17 November. In France, the deployed elements were assigned to the Provisional USAFE 7108th Tactical Wing on 20 November due to the reduced strength of the 108th TFW in Europe. The primary mission of the 7108th was to provide close air support to the Seventh Army in Europe under the direction of Ground Forward Air Controllers. To accomplish this mission, up to 30 sorties were flown each day. The deployment to France ended in October 1962 and the unit returned to New Jersey state control, leaving the F-84Fs in France.

Upon return from France, the squadron was moved from Trenton to McGuire AFB due to air congestion in the Philadelphia area. At McGuire AFB, the squadron was re-equipped with North American F-86H Sabres.  Beginning in 1965, the Sabres were retired and the squadron began to receive the F-105B Thunderchief. The 108th TFW was the first Air National Guard unit to fly twice the speed of sound. In May 1981, the F-4D Phantom II replaced the F-105s, and in 1985, they were upgraded to the F-4E Phantom II.

With the end of the Cold War, the parent 108th Tactical Fighter Wing was re-aligned to a KC-135 Stratotanker Air Refueling Wing.  The F-4s were retired and the squadron was re-designated as the 141st Air Refueling Squadron.  Also, as part of the conversion of the wing to the Objective Wing organization, the 108th Tactical Fighter Group became the 108th Operations Group, to which the 141st ARS was assigned.  The 141st ARS was certified combat ready on 3 December 1992. The very next day it was tasked with its first operational deployment – nothing less than spearheading and establishing the U.S. – Somalia air bridge for the Unified Task Force deployment there. It deployed an air refueling detachment to Moron Air Base, Spain.

In September 1994, for over 30 days, five aircraft deployed to Pisa Airport, Italy for Operation Deny Flight. The wing replaced the 126th ARW of the Illinois Air National Guard. The 108th ARW was the first Air National Guard unit to take full responsibility during that period.

In 2007, the 141st ARS began retiring its KC-135E aircraft and transitioning to the KC-135R.

Lineage

 141st Air Refueling Squadron
 Organized on 8 October 1917 as an undesignated unit.
 Designated 141st Aero Squadron  on 2 January 1918
 Redesignated 141st Aero Squadron (Pursuit) on 16 September 1918
 Demobilized on 19 July 1919
 Reconstituted, redesignated 141st Tactical Fighter Squadron, allotted to the National Guard and extended federal recognition on 8 September 1973
 Redesignated 141st Air Refueling Squadron on 19 October 1991

 141st Tactical Fighter Squadron
 Constituted as the 341st Fighter Squadron (Single Engine) on 24 September 1942
 Activated on 30 September 1942
 Inactivated on 10 May 1946
 Redesignated 141st Fighter Squadron, Single Engine and allotted to the National Guard on 24 May 1946
 Activated and extended federal recognition on 26 May 1949
 Federalized and placed on active duty on 1 March 1951
 Redesignated 141st Fighter-Bomber Squadron on 16 May 1951
 Inactivated and released from active duty on 1 December 1952
 Returned to New Jersey state control and activated on 1 December 1952
 Redesignated 141st Fighter-Interceptor Squadron c. 1 July 1955
 Redesignated 141st Tactical Fighter Squadron (Special Delivery) on 1 July 1958
 Federalized and placed on active duty on 1 October 1961
 Released from active duty, returned to New Jersey state control and redesignated 141st Tactical Fighter Squadron on 30 August 1962
 Withdrawn from the National Guard, redesignated 341st Fighter Squadron and disbanded on 8 September 1973

Assignments

 Post Headquarters, Rockwell Field, 8 October 1917
 Aviation Concentration Center, 9 January 1918
 Air Service Headquarters, AEF, British Isles, 30 January 1918 (attached to the Royal Flying Corps for training after 31 January 1918)
 Replacement Concentration Center, AEF, 16 August 1918
 Air Service Production Center No. 2, AEF, 27 August – 16 September 1918
 4th Pursuit Group, 23 October 1918
 5th Pursuit Group, 19 April 1919

 1st Air Depot, 18 June 1919
 Commanding General, Services of Supply, July 1919
 Eastern Department, July 1919
 348th Fighter Group, 30 September 1942 – 10 May 1946
 108th Fighter Group (later 108th Fighter-Bomber Group), 26 May 1949 – 1 December 1952
 108th Fighter-Bomber Group (later 108th Fighter-Interceptor Group, 108th Tactical Fighter Group), 10 November 1952
 7108th Tactical Fighter Wing, 1 October 1961
 108th Tactical Fighter Group, 30 August 1962 – 8 September 1973
 108th Tactical Fighter Group, 8 September 1973
 108th Operations Group, 19 October 1991 – present
 Deployment to Incirlik AB, Turkey 1990's

Stations

 Rockwell Field, California, 8 October 1917
 Aviation Concentration Center, Garden City, New York, 9 January 1918
 Morn Hill Rest Camp, Winchester, England, 31 January 1918
 "A" flight, Dover, England, 1 February-9 March 1918
 "B" flight, Hounslow Heath Aerodrome, England, 1 February-9 March 1918
 "C" flight, Northolt Airdrome, England, 1 February-9 March 1918
 Swingate Down Airdrome, England, 10 March-10 August 1918
 St. Maixent Replacement Barracks, France, 16 August 1918
 Romorantin Aerodrome, France, 27 August 1918
 Colombey-les-Belles Airdrome, France, 16 September 1918
 Croix de Metz Aerodrome (Toul), France, 19 October 1918
 Coblenz Airdrome (Fort Kaiser Alexander), Germany, 19 April 1919
 Colombey-les-Belles Airdrome, France, 18 June 1919
 France, July 1919
 Camp Mills, New York, July 1919
 Mitchel Field, New York, 30 September 1942
 Bradley Field, Connecticut, 30 September 1942
 Westover Field, Massachusetts, 30 October 1942
 Hillsgrove Army Air Field, Rhode Island, 23 January 1943
 Westover Field, Massachusetts, 26 April – 9 May 1943

 Jackson Airfield (7 Mile Drome), Port Moresby, New Guinea, 23 June 1943
 Finschafen Airfield (Dreger Field), New Guinea, 13 December 1943
 Saidor Airfield, New Guinea, 13 March 1944
 Wakde Airfield, Netherlands East Indies, 26 May 1944
 Kornasoren (Yebrurro) Airfield Noemfoor, Netherlands East Indies, 24 August 1944
 Tacloban Airfield, Leyte, Philippines, 30 November 1944
 Tanauan Airfield, Leyte, Philippines, 14 December 1944
 San Marcelino Airfield, Luzon, Philippines, 4 February 1945
 Floridablanca Airfield, Luzon, Philippines, c. 15 May 1945
 Ie Shima Airfield, Ryuku Islands, 9 July 1945
 Kanoya Airfield, Japan, 9 September 1945
 Itami Airfield, Japan, c. 20 October 1945 – 10 May 1946
 Mercer Airport, New Jersey, 26 May 1949
 Turner Air Force Base, Georgia, 1 March 1951
 Godman Air Force Base, Kentucky, 11 December 1951 – 1 December 1952
 McGuire Air Force Base, New Jersey, 1 December 1952
 Chaumont-Semoutiers Air Base, France, 1 October 1961
 McGuire Air Force Base, New Jersey, 30 August 1962 – 8 September 1973
 McGuire Air Force Base, New Jersey, 8 September 1973 – present

Aircraft

 SPAD S.VII, 1918
 SPAD S.XIII, 1918–1919
 P-47 Thunderbolt, 1942–1945
 P-51D Mustang, 1945–1946
 F-47D Thunderbolt, 1949–1952
 F-51H Mustang, 1952–1955
 F-86E Sabre, 1955–1958

 F-84F Thunderstreak, 1958–1962
 F-86H Sabre, 1962–1965
 F-105B Thunderchief, 1965–1981
 F-4D Phantom II, 1981–1985
 F-4E Phantom II, 1985–1991
 KC-135E Stratotanker, 1991–2007
 KC-135R Stratotanker, 2007 – present

Aircraft flying in this unit
KC-135
58-0010(R) (Nov'14); 63-8040(R) (Nov'14)

Operations and decorations
 Combat Operations: World War I; World War II
 Campaigns: Meuse-Argonne Offensive; Air Offensive, Japan; Bismark-Archipelago; Luzon; Northern Solomons; New Guinea; Ryukyus; Southern Philippines
 Decorations:
 Presidential Unit Citation, New Britain, 16–31 December 1943
 Presidential Unit Citation, Philippines, 24 December 1944 – 9 July 1945

Heraldry
Unit Emblem: A Great Bengal tiger with orange and black markings playing with a German helmet and Iron Cross. The Tiger is intended to be a Princeton Tiger in honor of Captain Hobey Baker, the squadron commander, of Princeton University fame.   Designed by Lt. Slaughter; approved in 1918; transferred to the 141st Tactical Fighter Squadron on 30 October 1973; approved on 6 January 1988.

See also

 Organization of the Air Service of the American Expeditionary Force
 List of American aero squadrons

References

 
 
 United States War Department (1920), Battle Participation of Organizations of the American Expeditionary Forces in France, Belgium and Italy, 1917–1919, Washington, Government Printing Office, 1920
 David K. Vaughan, Flying for the Air Service: The Hughes Brothers in World War I, Bowling Green State University Popular Press, OH 43403, .

External links
 141st Air Refueling Squadron lineage and history

Squadrons of the United States Air National Guard
Air refueling squadrons of the United States Air Force
Military units and formations in New Jersey